Norman Fox (29 July 1904 – 7 May 1972) was an Australian cricketer. He played two first-class matches for New South Wales in 1926/27.

See also
 List of New South Wales representative cricketers

References

External links
 

1904 births
1972 deaths
Australian cricketers
New South Wales cricketers
Cricketers from Sydney